Sialkot , is a tehsil located in Sialkot District, Punjab, Pakistan. It is administratively subdivided into 52 Union Councils.

History
According to the 1901 census, taken during British rule the tehsil of Sialkot contained 637 villages and a population of 312,688 an increase of almost 10,000 since the 1891 census (302,866). The land revenue and cesses in 1903-4 amounted to Rs.4,00,000.

Administration
The tehsil is subdivided into 52 Union Councils, these are:

References

Sialkot District
Tehsils of Punjab, Pakistan